Qu'a Yuba: Live at the Iridium, Vol. 2 is a live album by pianist Cecil Taylor. It was recorded at the Iridium Jazz Club in New York City in March 1998, and was released later that year by Cadence Jazz Records. On the album, Taylor is joined by saxophonist Harri Sjöström, bassist Dominic Duval, and drummer Jackson Krall. The recording is the companion to Qu'a: Live at the Iridium, Vol. 1, recorded on the same date.

Reception

In a review for AllMusic, Steve Loewy wrote: "It defies odds that the pianist, after so many years, continues to astound with his totally original performances. This one is vintage Taylor, with the pianist in full throttle, winding and turning phrases with characteristic brilliance. The almost unbearable intensity continues unabated, but there are waves of delicacy, too... Cecil Taylor has never played better, his technique at once symphonic and enthralling. If possible, part two surpasses the quality of part one, but it is clearly a close call."

The authors of the Penguin Guide to Jazz Recordings wrote: "Krall... is inventive and often delicately propulsive... Taylor's intensity seems as trenchant as ever."

Track listing

 "Qu'a Yuba" (Cecil Taylor) – 47:12

Personnel 
 Cecil Taylor – piano
 Harri Sjöström – soprano saxophone
 Dominic Duval – bass
 Jackson Krall – drums

References

1998 live albums
Cecil Taylor live albums
Cadence Jazz Records live albums